The Under 18 Australian Championships are Field Hockey tournaments held annually in Australia. The tournament hosts ten teams from around Australia, one (or two) from each of the eight states. The event is split into men's and women's tournaments, played usually in the middle of the year.

In the 2017 edition, Pakistan U18 won the men's tournament for the first time by defeating New South Wales 3–2 in the final. Western Australia won the bronze medal by defeating Tasmania 4–2 in the third and fourth place playoff. In the women's tournament, Queensland won the tournament for the fourth time, by defeating New South Wales 2–0 in the final. Western Australia won the bronze medal by defeating Victoria 4–1 in the third and fourth playoff.

Competition format

The tournament is divided into two pools, Pool A and Pool B, consisting of five teams in a round robin format, with a crossover match taking place between one team from each pool at some stage in the pool stage. Teams then progress into either Pool C, the medal round, or Pool D, the classification round. Teams carry over points from their previous match ups, and contest teams they are yet to play.

The top two teams in each of pools A and B then progress to Pool C. The top two teams in Pool C continue to contest the Final, while the bottom two teams of Pool C play in the Third and Fourth place match.

The remaining bottom placing teams make up Pool D. The team play the remainder of teams they are yet to face, and final placing in pool D determines final placing overall.

Competition rules
The tournament has not adapted FIH rules of four 15–minute quarters, but rather plays matches in two 35–minute halves.

Points System

Finals Matches

During finals if games end in a tie, no overtime will be played and the match will go straight to a penalty shoot-out.

Men's tournament

Results
Note: The following summaries comprise results from 2014 onwards, while the tournament was founded earlier.

Team Performances

Women's tournament

Results
Note: The following summaries comprise results from 2014 onwards, while the tournament was founded earlier.

Team Performances

References

Field hockey competitions in Australia
Under-18 sport